Obata (written: , ,  or ) is a Japanese surname. Notable people with the surname include:

, Japanese rower
, Japanese-American artist
Gyo Obata (1923–2022), American architect
, general in the Imperial Japanese Army in World War II
, martial artist, choreographer, actor, and founder of Shikendo
, Japanese karate master
, Japanese football player
, Japanese long-distance runner
, retired amateur Japanese freestyle wrestler
, Confucian scholar and samurai
, Japanese samurai warrior
, Japanese samurai warrior of the Sengoku Period
Reiko Obata, Japanese-American koto performer and composer
, Japanese tennis player
, Japanese manga artist
, Japanese footballer

See also
Obata, Mie, a former town in Mie Prefecture, Japan

Japanese-language surnames